Ștefan  Dobay (26 September 1909 – 7 April 1994), was a Romanian footballer who played as a striker and manager.

He played for Ripensia Timișoara and the Romania national football team for whom he got 41 caps, scored 19 goals and he appeared at the 1934 and 1938 World Cups as a forward and scoring a goal in each tournament.

Honours

Player
Ripensia Timișoara

 Romanian League: 4
 1932–33, 1934–35, 1935–36, 1937–38
 Romanian Cup: 2
 1933–34, 1935–36

Romania
 Balkan Cup: 2
1933, 1936

Individual
 Romanian League:
 Top Scorer (4): 1932–33, 1933–34, 1934–35, 1936–37

Manager
CCA / Steaua București

 Romanian League: 1
 1956

References

Selected publications

External links

1909 births
1994 deaths
Romanian footballers
Association football forwards
Liga I players
Liga II players
Banatul Timișoara players
FC Ripensia Timișoara players
CS Gaz Metan Mediaș players
FC Steaua București managers
Romania international footballers
Romanian football managers
CS Gaz Metan Mediaș managers
FC UTA Arad managers
CFR Cluj managers
FCV Farul Constanța managers
1934 FIFA World Cup players
1938 FIFA World Cup players
Romanian sportspeople of Hungarian descent
People from Timiș County
People from the Kingdom of Hungary